Matthew Eric Preston (born 16 March 1995) is an English professional footballer who plays as a defender for Solihull Moors.

Club career

Walsall
Preston was captain of the Walsall youth team when he signed an 18-month professional contract with Walsall in January 2013.

In January 2014 he joined up with Icelandic side ÍBV—managed by former Walsall player Sigurður Ragnar Eyjólfsson—on loan. He played in a 2–1 loss against Stjarnan in a pre-season tournament, but was not taken on by ÍBV and subsequently returned to Walsall. After his brief spell in Iceland, Preston spent two-months on loan at Northern Premier League side Barwell making twelve appearances and scoring one goal. He made his debut for the "Saddlers" in the Football League on 10 February 2015, coming on for Michael Cain 89 minutes into a 3–2 victory over Rochdale at the Bescot Stadium.

Preston's contract with Walsall expired at the end of the 2016–17 season.

Swindon Town
Following his release from Walsall, Preston joined Swindon Town in September 2017, on a deal until the end of the campaign.

On 30 September 2017, he made his Swindon debut during their 2–0 home victory against Cambridge United, featuring for the entire 90 minutes. A week later, Preston scored his first Swindon goal during their 2–1 away defeat against Cheltenham Town, netting the Robins' equaliser in the 53rd minute. On 31 October 2017, he went onto score the winner in Swindon's EFL Trophy tie against Wycombe Wanderers, netting in the 88th minute. During Swindon's 1–0 victory over Mansfield Town, Preston suffered a serious knee injury ruling him out for the remainder of the 2017–18 campaign.

Mansfield Town
On 29 May 2018, Preston reunited with former manager, David Flitcroft at Mansfield Town after rejecting a new three-year deal at Swindon.  He was released by Mansfield at the end of the 2019–20 season.

Barnet
Preston signed for Barnet on 1 October 2020. He left the club by mutual consent in July 2021 after 16 appearances.

Solihull Moors
Preston joined Solihull Moors on a two-year deal on 20 July 2021.

Kidderminster Harriers (loan)

In January 2022, Preston joined National League North side  Kidderminster Harriers on a two-month loan deal.

On 5 February 2022, he played in the Harriers’ 4th round FA Cup tie against Premier League side  West Ham United, where he was awarded the BBC Man of the Match award by pundit Dion Dublin.

Preston’s loan spell was cut short on 19 February 2022, after receiving a serious ankle injury from a tackle against  Alfreton Town. The match itself ended up being abandoned due to the injury.

Career statistics

References

External links

1995 births
Living people
English footballers
Association football defenders
Walsall F.C. players
Íþróttabandalag Vestmannaeyja players
Barwell F.C. players
Swindon Town F.C. players
Mansfield Town F.C. players
Barnet F.C. players
Solihull Moors F.C. players
Kidderminster Harriers F.C. players
Northern Premier League players
English Football League players
National League (English football) players
Expatriate footballers in Iceland
English expatriate footballers
English expatriate sportspeople in Iceland